Thyreus histrio, is a species of bee belonging to the family Apidae subfamily Apinae.

References

External links
 http://animaldiversity.org/accounts/Thyreus_histrio/classification/
 https://www.academia.edu/7390502/AN_UPDATED_CHECKLIST_OF_BEES_OF_SRI_LANKA_WITH_NEW_RECORDS
 https://www.itis.gov/servlet/SingleRpt/SingleRpt?search_topic=TSN&search_value=767127

Apinae
Hymenoptera of Asia
Insects of Sri Lanka
Insects described in 1775
Taxa named by Johan Christian Fabricius